Dongying South railway station is a railway station in Dongying District, Dongying, Shandong, China.

The freight-only Huanghua–Dajiawa railway passes between the station building and platforms, but does not have a stop here.

History 
The station opened with the Dezhou–Dajiawa railway on 28 September 2015.

See also
Dongying railway station

References 

Railway stations in Shandong
Railway stations in China opened in 2015